Hazira Port or Surat Port is a deep-water liquefied natural gas (LNG) terminal and multi-cargo deep-water port about 20 miles southwest of Surat, India built by Hazira Port Private Limited (HPPL). The LNG facility is operational, while the cargo port is under development. It is a joint venture between Shell Gas B.V (Shell) and Total Gaz Electricité Holdings France (Total). Shell holds 74% in the venture, with Total holds the remainder.

See also
List of tourist attractions in Surat

References

Economy of Surat
Ports and harbours of Gujarat
Transport in Surat
Year of establishment missing